Kernen im Remstal is a municipality in the Rems-Murr district of Baden-Württemberg, Germany. It was formed in January 1975 by the union of the towns of Stetten im Remstal and Rommelshausen. Its name was initially Stetten-Rommelshausen, but a community referendum resulted in its being changed to Kernen im Remstal, after a local hill.

Name
The name "Kernen im Remstal" was decided by the inhabitants of the municipality and refers to the Kernen, the highest point in the municipality. The previous name, used since the formation of the municipality, was "Stetten-Rommelshausen".

History

Rommelshausen
Rommelshausen was connected to European railways in 1861 via the Stuttgart-Bad Cannstatt–Aalen railway, and this connection has greatly enabled the town's growth. It began a period of urban sprawl after from 1945 and into the 1970s to the northwest and southeast. Further developments in the 1990s spread Rommelshausen even further to the south.

Stetten
Stetten also enjoyed a period of growth after World War II and spread to the north and west.

Geography
The municipality (Gemeinde) of Kernen im Remstal is found in the Rems-Murr district of Baden-Württemberg, a state of the Federal Republic of Germany. Kernen is lies at the southern edge of the district, along its border with Stuttgart and the district of Esslingen am Neckar. Elevation above sea level in the municipal area ranges from a high of  Normalnull (NN) to a low of  NN.

Politics
Kernen has two boroughs (Ortsteile): Rommelshausen and Stetten.

Coat of arms
The municipal coat of arms for Kernen shows six diamonds, the upper three blue and the lower three black, upon a field of yellow. The diamonds are holdovers from the coat of arms of the municipality of Stetten im Remstal, which was itself derived from the arms of the House of Teck, which had been used outright by Rommelshausen. This coat of arms, and an accompanying municipal flag, were awarded to Kernen by the Rems-Murr district office on 3 January 1977.

Transportation
Local public transportation is provided by the Verkehrs- und Tarifverbund Stuttgart.

External links
  (in German)

References

Rems-Murr-Kreis
Württemberg